The Xiaomi Redmi Note 2 is a middle class Android smartphone by Xiaomi. It comes in two variants. It has 13 MP rear camera and 5 MP front camera.

Specifications

Hardware
The low end variant is Redmi Note 2, which is powered by a MediaTek MT6795 Helio X10 Octa-core 2.0 GHz Cortex-A53 prosessor  coupled with 2 GB of RAM and 16 GB of Internal Storage. The High end variant is Redmi Note 2 Prime , which is powered by a MediaTek MT6795 Helio X10 Octa-core 2.2 GHz Cortex-A53 prosessor  coupled with 2 GB of RAM and 32 GB of Internal Storage.

Software
Xiaomi Redmi Note 2 runs on Android Lollipop 5.0 on top of MIUI 7 and can be upgraded to MIUI 9. It is also possible to flash a custom ROM with Android 7, 8 or 9, but there is no official support by LineageOS.

References

Android (operating system) devices
Mobile phones introduced in 2015
Redmi smartphones
Phablets
Discontinued smartphones
Mobile phones with user-replaceable battery